Anolis cryptolimifrons is a species of lizard in the family Dactyloidae.

References

Anoles
Reptiles described in 2008
Taxa named by Gunther Köhler
Reptiles of Costa Rica
Reptiles of Panama